Felicita Vestvali (born Anna Marie Stegemann, also known as Felicità von Vestvali; 23 February 1831 – 3 April 1880) was an opera singer and actress famous in Europe and the United States.

She was known in North America as "Vestvali the Magnificent" or "Magnificent Vestvali" and was praised by Abraham Lincoln and Napoleon III. Vestali was admired for her beauty and her contralto voice and for her independence from the norms of femininity at the time. She was a self-described "man-hater" ("Männerfeindin") and widely described as Uranian, with links to the feminist movement, the nascent movement for gay and lesbian rights, and to the movements for racial and religious emancipation.

Life
Her family background is unclear. According to Ludwig Eisenberg, Vestvali came from an old noble family. Despite her Italian stage name, Vestvali was born in Stettin, Germany (now Szczecin, Poland), as Anna Marie Stegemann. Her father, a senior civil servant, had adopted the name "Stegemann" for political reasons, and her mother was Baroness von Hünefeld. There was a claim that her father was named count Pawłowski, and she was born in Berlin in 1841. According to another source, her father belonged to the Polish noble family of Westfalowicz. Others indicate that she was born in 1834 as the daughter of a high Austrian official in Kraków.

Vestvali's family refused her a theater training, so in 1846 at the age of 15, she ran away from home in boy's clothes and joined the impresario Wilhelm Bröckelmann and his theater company in Leipzig. With Bröckelmann's group, Vestvali undertook a long tour to various northern German city theaters. Back in Leipzig, she was discovered by actress Wilhelmine Schröder-Devrient and accepted as a student. With her support, Vestvali was able to make her debut there at the Altes Theater in the role of Agathe in Der Freischütz.

After a short guest appearance at the Hanover Opera House, Vestvali went to France to the Conservatoire de Paris. This was followed by a concert tour as a soloist. In the winter of 1855/56, she was a student with Romani in Florence and Saverio Mercadante in Naples. During this time, she took the stage name Felicita Vestvali and sang as a supposedly Italian singer in La Scala in her first travesti role of Romeo.

This was followed by successes in Paris, London, New York and Mexico City. After that, she had planned a long vacation in Italy, but Emperor Napoleon III brought her back to the Paris Opera. He was so captivated with her that he presented her with a solid silver suit of armor for her performance as Romeo in Bellini's Romeo and Juliet. The audience celebrated her performances enthusiastically and the critics compared her to Maria Malibran, Wilhelmine Schröder-Devrient and Rachel Félix.

With a French opera company, she made a tour through France, Belgium and Holland and in 1862 another tour to New York followed. There she worked with colleagues like Charles Kean. In the United States, Vestvali was the first female Hamlet actress ever (in travesti). From this time on, she was also called "the female Kean". Karl Gutzkow suggested her in the preface to his play Richard Savage as a candidate for the leading role.

After bad reviews of her appearance in Gluck's Orfeo ed Euridice in San Francisco in 1865, she switched from musical theater to speaking roles. She returned to Europe and was again successful. She appeared as Romeo and Hamlet in Shakespeare's dramas. She played these roles in 1867 in London's Lyceum Theatre in English. Queen Victoria attended a performance. The Royal Academy of Arts made her an honorary member.

In the spring of 1868, Vestvali performed in Hamburg and Lübeck. Afterwards, she went on a two-year tour through Europe. When the Franco-Prussian War ended in 1871, Vestvali rarely performed and retired more and more into private life. She spent the last years of her life in Bad Warmbrunn. During a visit to friends in Warsaw, she fell ill and died on April 3, 1880, six weeks after her 49th birthday. During her last illness, she was "nursed by a Miss G", as well as her "inseparable friend" and principal heir, the German actress Elise Lund, "who came to nurse her also" and later took Vestvali's body to Bad Warmbrunn.

References 

1831 births
1880 deaths
German LGBT singers
19th-century German women opera singers
German stage actresses
Musicians from Szczecin
Actors from Szczecin
Lesbian singers
German lesbian actresses
German lesbian musicians